{{DISPLAYTITLE:C13H19NO3}}
The molecular formula C13H19NO3 (molar mass: 237.29 g/mol) may refer to:

 Allylescaline
 Gigantine
 Jimscaline
 Methylenedioxymethoxyethylamphetamine
 Pellotine
 Viloxazine